Ruslan Ternovoi (born 10 April 2001) is a Russian diver. In 2018, he won the bronze medal in both the boys' 3m springboard and boys' 10m platform events at the 2018 Summer Youth Olympics held in Buenos Aires, Argentina. He also won the bronze medal in the mixed team event alongside Sofiya Lyskun of Ukraine.

In 2019, he won the bronze medal in the men's 10 metre platform event at the 2019 European Diving Championships held in Kyiv, Ukraine. Ternovoi and Uliana Kliueva finished in 5th place in the mixed 3 m springboard synchro event.

References

External links 
 

Living people
2001 births
Place of birth missing (living people)
Russian male divers
Divers at the 2018 Summer Youth Olympics